"Liar Liar" is the first internationally charting single of American singer-songwriter Cris Cab released on Island Def Jam Records. The song was written by Dallas Austin, Pharrell Williams and Cristian Cabrerizo and produced by Austin and Williams. Though Pharrell is featured in the song and the accompanying music video he is not officially credited on the cover of the single as a featured artist.

Music video
A music video was released for the single was filmed by Aggressive, directed by Alex Topaller and Dan Shapiro and produced by Shapiro and Kelvin Carver. The video, shot in black and white shows, Cris Cab strumming his guitar, or singing or in a relationship with some mysterious women. The video is an array of such women, an "arresting symmetry"" in light and in shadow about some dangerous relationships with these attractive women showing off with their parallel mirrored images. Pharrell Williams makes cameo appearance in the video. Visuals and bits of intimate narrative are revealed and obscured by these reflections, teasing the viewer that there is tantalizing truth to be revealed. The video ends with one of the girls "capturing" Cab and tying him to a chair.

Chart performance
The single first charted on Dutch Top 40 in 2013 reaching number 9. Since its initial charting, it has become an international hit for him, peaking at number 14 on Dutch Single Top 100, number 25 in Germany and becoming a charting hit in France and in Belgium in both Flanders and French language markets.

Controversy
The melody could be considered reminiscent of The Lightning Seed's version of You Showed Me (originally released by The Turtles) but as yet this remains unverified.

Charts and certifications

Weekly charts

Year-end charts

Certifications

References

External links
"Liar Liar" on iTunes

2013 singles
Songs written by Dallas Austin
Songs written by Pharrell Williams
Song recordings produced by Pharrell Williams
2013 songs
Number-one singles in Israel